The Real Has Come! is an upcoming South Korean television series starring Ahn Jae-hyun, Baek Jin-hee, Kim Sa-kwon, and Cha Joo-young. Directed by Han Joon-seo, the weekend drama depicts the story of an unmarried pregnant woman and an umarried man who enter into a false contract which leads them to romance, pregnancy, childbirth, and childrearing. It will premiere on KBS2 on March 25, 2023 and air on every Saturday and Sunday at 19:55 (KST).

Cast and characters

Main
 Ahn Jae-hyun as Gong Tae-kyung
 34 years old, a highly skilled obstetrician and gynecologist specializing in infertility clinics. The third son of a wealthy chaebol family.
 Baek Jin-hee as Oh Yeon-doo
 33 years old, a Korean language instructor, who is a star in the online lecture world. She is a K-eldest daughter with an unique positive mindset, which gives her tenacity, and ability to survive at the highest level.
 Cha Joo-young as Jang Se-jin
 34 years old, a childhood friend of Gong Tae-kyung and NX Group Chief of Staff. She has outstanding work ability and assists the chairman, she is also trusted by the chairman's family.
 Chung Eui-je as Kim Jun-ha 
 34 years old, Oh Yeon-doo's ex-boyfriend, an investment expert who values investment the most. The birth father of the child inside Yeon-doo's belly. 
 Choi Ja-hye as Gong Ji-myeong 
37 years old, Gong Tae-kyung's older sister, she is  a managing director at her father's company. She is married to her brother's medical school senior Cha Hyun-woo
 Kim Sa-kwon as Cha Hyun-woo 
 37 years old, chief of obstetrics and gynecology and the husband of Gong Tae-kyung's older sister Gong Ji-myeong

Supporting

People around Oh Yeon-doo 
 Kim Hye-ok as Kang Bong-nim
 59 years old, Oh Yeon-doo's mother, who cares deeply for her children
 Ryu Jin as Kang Dae-sang
 43 years old, Yeondu's maternal uncle, Bong-nim's younger brother
 Choi Yoon-jae as Oh Dong-wook
 25 years old, Oh Yeon-doo's younger brother, a single dad, who is raising a daughter by himself after becoming a father at the age of 18
 Jeong Seo-yeon as Oh Soo-gyeom  
 7 years old, Oh Yeon-doo's niece and Oh Dong-wook's daughter

People around Gong Tae-kyung 
 Kang Boo-ja as Eun-geum-sil 
 80 years old, Gong Tae-kyung's step-grandmother, mother of corporate chairman Gong Chan-sik
 Hong Yo-seob as Gong Chan-sik 
 64 years old, corporate chairman of NX Group, Gong Tae-kyung's step-father 
 Cha Hwa-yeon as Lee In-ok
 59 years old, Gong Chan-sik's wife and Gong Tae-kyung's mother
 Choi Dae-chul as Gong Chun-myeong
 39 years old, Gong Tae-kyung's older brother, managing director, finance team, NX Group
 Yoon Joo-hee as Yoon Su-jeong 
 35 years old, Gong Chun-myeong's wife. She comes from a strong family background and has a high nose. Even her mother-in-law pampers her.
  as Gong Yoo-myeong
 26 years old, Tae-kyung's younger sister, rich family's youngest daughter

People around Se-jin

 Kim Chang-wan as Jang-ho 
 64 years old, Sejin's father, very compassionate and upright person.
 Lee Kan-hee as Juh wa-ja
 55 years old, Sejin's mother, loves to be in the spotlight and is prone to vanity and extravagance.

Others 
 Lee Si-kang as Han Seong-hoon
 Lee Han-wi as Han Sang-ho

Production
Initially Kwak Si-yang was selected as main lead opposite Baek Jin-hee, but on December 21, 2022, it was reported that he dropped out due to scheduling problems. Ahn Jae-hyun replaced Kwak Si-yang, who is making come back after 3 years, since he last appeared in 2019 series Love with Flaws. Baek Jin-hee, having last appeared in 2018 TV series Feel Good to Die, making a come back after 4 years. Kim Sa-kwon appeared in KBS daily drama Home for Summer in 2019, since then he is appearing in present TV series for KBS. The script reading site was revealed on February 9, 2023.

Release
With release of teaser poster the release date was announced on February 16, 2023. The series is scheduled for release on March 25, 2023.

References

External links
  
 
 The Real Has Come! at Naver 
 The Real Has Come! at Daum 
 
 
 

Korean Broadcasting System television dramas
2023 South Korean television series debuts
Korean-language television shows
Television series about families
Television series by Victory Contents
South Korean romantic comedy television series
Upcoming television series